Número 2 is María Isabel's second album and was released in 2005.

Track listing
"Pues va a ser que no"
"Quién da la vez"
"Mi abuela"
"María Isabel número 2"
"Tu libertad"
"3x2"
"Me enamoro"
"Original"
"La reina de la fiesta"
"Piel de chocolate"
"De Ayamonte pa'l mundo"
"En mi jardín" (bonus track)

Singles 
"Pues va a ser que no"
"En mi jardín"
"Quién Da La Vez"

2005 albums
María Isabel albums